This is a list of prominent alumni of the Phi Delta Theta fraternity. Names are listed followed by the school attended and their graduation year.

Academia
 Liberty Hyde Bailey, Michigan State University, 1882 – horticulturist, botanist, father of modern horticulture
 Guy Potter Benton, Ohio Wesleyan, 1886 – president of Miami University (1902–1911); president of University of the Philippines (1921–1925)
 John R. Conniff, Tulane University, 1893 – educator; 7th president of Louisiana Tech University
 Steve Hanke, University of Colorado, 1964 – economist
 Joel Henry Hildebrand, University of Pennsylvania, 1903 – pioneer chemist
 Vernon Lyman Kellogg, University of Kansas, 1889 – entomologist
 Robert Khayat, University of Mississippi, 1960 – chancellor of the University of Mississippi (1995–2009)
 Charles Boynton Knapp, Iowa State University, 1967 – president of the University of Georgia (1987–1997)
 Frederic Brewster Loomis, Amherst College, 1896 – paleontologist
 William Harding Mayes, Vanderbilt University, 1881 – founder of the University of Texas School of Journalism; Dean (1914–1927)
 John D. Millett, DePauw University – president of Miami University
Santa J. Ono, University of British Columbia – president of University of Michigan; president and vice-chancellor of University of British Columbia (2016-2022); President University of Cincinnati (2012–2016)
 Don K. Price, Vanderbilt University, 1931 – political scientist
 Adam G. Riess, M.I.T., 1992 – winner of the 2011 Nobel Prize in Physics
 Walter Riggs, Auburn University, 1892 – president of Clemson University (1910–1924)
 William C. Roberts, Southern Methodist University, 1954 – cardiologist and pathologist; first head of pathology for the National Heart, Lung and Blood Institute
 Andrew Sledd, Randolph-Macon College, 1893 – founding president of the modern University of Florida (1905–1909); president of Southern University (1910–1914); first professor of New Testament Literature at the Candler School of Theology, Emory University (1914–1939); Methodist minister and theologian
 John J. Tigert, Vanderbilt University, 1902 – president of Kentucky Wesleyan College (1909–1913); US Commissioner of Education (1921–1928); third president of the University of Florida (1928–1947)
 William G. Tight –  president of the University of New Mexico (1902–1909)
 T. K. Wetherell, Florida State University, 1968 – president of Florida State University (2003–2009)

Aerospace and astronomy
 Neil Armstrong, Purdue University, 1955 – Commander of Apollo 11 and first man to walk on the Moon
 William F. Durand, Michigan State, 1880 – first civilian chair of the National Advisory Committee for Aeronautics, the forerunner of NASA
 Jon McBride, West Virginia, 1964 – NASA astronaut, Space Shuttle Columbia
 F. Story Musgrave, Syracuse University, 1958 – NASA astronaut, Space Shuttle Challenger, Space Shuttle Columbia
 Thomas Jefferson Jackson See, University of Missouri, 1889 – astronomer for the United States Navy
 Joel Stebbins, University of Nebraska – Lincoln, 1899 – astronomer

Art and architecture
 Francis Chapin, Washington & Jefferson College, 1921 – painter
 Julian Franklin Everett, University of Wisconsin, 1894 – architect known for his work in Seattle
 Hank Ketcham, University of Washington, 1941 – cartoonist, creator of Dennis the Menace comic strip
 Frank Lloyd Wright, University of Wisconsin, 1888 – architect

Business
 Robert Allen, Wabash College, 1957 – chairman of AT&T (1988–97)
 John Y. Brown, Jr., University of Kentucky, 1956 – co-founder of Kentucky Fried Chicken; former Kentucky Governor
 Tim Collins, Depauw University, 1978 – founder, senior managing director, and CEO of Ripplewood Holdings LLC
 William H. Danforth, Washington University in St Louis, 1892 – founder of Ralston Purina Mills pet food company
 Robert Diamond, Colby College – president of Barclays PLC
 Charles W. "Chuck" Durham, Iowa State University, 1939 – former owner, CEO and chairman emeritus of HDR, Inc.
 The Honourable Trevor Eyton, OC, QC, University of Toronto, 1956 – former president and chief executive officer of Brascan Limited
 William F. Harrah, UCLA, 1934 – founder of Harrah's Hotel and Casinos
 Ray Lee Hunt, Southern Methodist University – chairman and chief executive officer of Hunt Oil Company
 F. Ross Johnson, University of Manitoba, 1952 – former CEO of RJR Nabisco
 John Willard Marriott, University of Utah, 1926 – founder of Marriott Corporation
 Edward Avery McIlhenny, Lehigh University, 1894 – son of Tabasco brand pepper sauce inventor Edmund McIlhenny
 James McLamore, Cornell University, 1942 – founder of Burger King
 Dave Morin, University of Colorado Boulder, 2003 – entrepreneur and angel investor
 Ronald K. Richey, Washburn University, 1949 – president and CEO of the Torchmark Corporation
 Hermon Scott, M.I.T. 1930 – founder of H.H. Scott, Inc.
 Roger Smith, University of Michigan, 1946 – chairman of General Motors
 David Steiner, Louisiana State University, 1982—former CEO of Waste Management
 Mark Suster, University of California San Diego, 1991 – entrepreneur, angel investor, and venture capitalist with Upfront Ventures
 John H. Tyson, University of Arkansas, 1975 – chairman of Tyson Foods
 Ralph C. Wilson Jr., University of Virginia, 1940 – founder, owner, and president of the Buffalo Bills football team; Pro Football Hall of Fame member, 2009

Entertainment

Film and television
 Harry Ackerman, Dartmouth College, 1935 – Emmy Award winner; producer of Gidget, Bewitched, I Dream of Jeannie, The Flying Nun, The Monkees, and The Partridge Family
 Joseph Ashton – actor, film and voice actor
 Austin (Bobkat) Aynes, Butler University, 2015  – actor, Good Bones
 Dirk Benedict, Whitman College, 1967 –  actor, The A-Team
 Ted Bessell, University of Colorado, 1957 – actor, daytime Emmy Award winner
 Bill Bixby, University of California (Berkeley), 1956 – actor, director, writer, The Incredible Hulk, My Favorite Martian
 Prince Lorenzo Borghese, Rollins College, 1995 – bachelor in The Bachelor: Rome
 Kurt Caceres, Sacramento State University, 1998 – actor, The Shield, Prison Break
 Trey Callaway, University of Southern California, 1989 – writer of I Still Know What You Did Last Summer; producer of CSI: NY
 Brett Claywell, North Carolina State 2000 – actor, One Tree Hill
 Dabney Coleman, University of Texas, 1953 – actor, Tootsie, Stuart Little
 Mike Connors, UCLA, 1950 – actor; Golden Globe Winner; Emmy Award winner for Mannix
 Tim Conway, Bowling Green University, 1956 – actor, McHale's Navy, The Carol Burnett Show
 Mark DeCarlo, Drake University, 1984 – actor, host on the Travel Channel
 Colby Donaldson, Texas Tech, 1996 – actor, runner-up on Survivor: The Australian Outback
 Jonathan Drubner, Syracuse University, 1991 – television personality; writer, ESPNU College Road Trip; head writer for the ESPY Awards
 George Eads, Texas Tech, 1990 – actor, CSI: Crime Scene Investigation
 Roger Ebert, University of Illinois, 1964 – film critic, author
 Donald Gibb, University of New Mexico, 1976 – actor, played "Ogre" in Revenge of the Nerds
 Dean Hargrove, Wichita State University, 1960 – producer, Emmy Award winner for Perry Mason, Matlock
 Van Heflin, University of Oklahoma, 1932 – Academy Award-winning actor
 Jeffrey Hunter, Northwestern University, 1950 – actor, King of Kings
 Richard Kelly, University of Southern California, 1997 – writer, producer, Donnie Darko
 Francis D. Lyon, UCLA, 1928 – Academy Award-winning editor
 Al Mayer Jr., CSUN, 1991 – Academy Award, Emmy Award for Technical Achievement
 Michael McDonald, University of Southern California, 1987 – actor, MADtv
 Michael Murphy, University of Arizona, 1960 – actor
 Brock Pemberton, University of Kansas, 1908 – founder of the Tony Awards
 James Pierce, Indiana University, 1920 – actor, Tarzan
 Burt Reynolds, Florida State, 1958 – actor, Golden Globe winner; star of Smokey and the Bandit
 Zachary Scott, University of Texas, 1935 – actor
 Ted Shackelford, Westminster College, 1968 – actor, Knots Landing
 Sonny Shroyer, University of Georgia, 1958 – actor, Dukes of Hazzard
 Donald Simpson, University of Oregon, 1966 – producer, Top Gun, Beverly Hills Cop, Days of Thunder, Bad Boys, The Rock
 Josh Taylor, Dartmouth College, 1965 – actor, Days of Our Lives, The Hogan Family
 Trey Wingo, Baylor University, 1985 – ESPN commentator; host of NFL PrimeTime
 Hugh Wilson, University of Florida, 1965 – Emmy Award winner; producer of WKRP in Cincinnati
 Robert Wise, Franklin College, 1936 – Academy Award-winning director/producer, West Side Story, Sound of Music

Music
 Josh Abbott, Texas Tech University – country musician, Josh Abbott Band
 Chris Cagle, Northwest Missouri State University, 2005 – country musician
 Frank Crumit, Ohio University, 1912 – singer and songwriter
 Casey Donahew, Texas A&M University – country musician, Casey Donahew Band
 Wayland Holyfield, University of Arkansas, 1964 – songwriter
 Bob James, University of Michigan, 1961 – jazz musician, Grammy Award recipient
 Werner Janssen, Dartmouth College, 1921 – conductor and composer
 Erich Kunzel, Dartmouth College, 1957 – symphony conductor; Grammy Award recipient
 Phil Pritchett, Southwestern University – country musician, singer and songwriter
 Phil Walden, Mercer University, 1962 – founder of Capricorn Records

Radio
 Edgar White Burrill, Amherst College, 1906 – radio announcer and lecturer
 Ken Niles, University of Montana, 1928 – radio actor
 Wendell Niles, University of Montana, 1927 – broadcaster during the Golden Age of radio

Video games
 Alex Seropian, University of Chicago, 1991 – developer of the Halo, Marathon, and Myth game series

Government

Canada
 James Bartleman, University of Western Ontario, 1963 – 27th Lieutenant Governor of Ontario
 William Moore Benidickson, University of Manitoba, 1932 – Canadian Senator, 1965–1985
 Leslie Blackwell, University of Toronto, 1923 – Attorney General of Ontario
 Louis Orville Breithaupt, University of Toronto, 1913 – 18th Lieutenant Governor of Ontario
 Donald Cameron, University of Alberta, 1939 – Canadian Senator of Alberta
 Henry Hague Davis, University of Toronto, 1907 – justice of the Supreme Court of Canada, 1935–1944
 Henry Read Emmerson, McGill University, 1906 – Canadian Senator of New Brunswick, 1949–1954
 The Honourable Trevor Eyton, OC, University of Toronto, 1956 – Canadian Senator
 Garde Gardom, University of British Columbia, 1946 – Lieutenant Governor of British Columbia, 1995–2001
 The Honourable Michael Kirby, OC, Dalhousie University, 1963 – Canadian Senator of Nova Scotia, 1984–2006; chair of the Mental Health Commission of Canada
 Victor Oland, Dalhousie University, 1933 – Lieutenant Governor of Nova Scotia, 1968–1973
 Arthur "Art" Phillips, University of British Columbia, 1953 – 32nd Mayor of Vancouver, 1973–1977
 Gerald Regan, Dalhousie University, 1952 – Premier of Nova Scotia, 1970–1978

Executive branch

 Thomas J. Anderson, Vanderbilt University, 1934, – the American Party presidential nominee in 1976.
 James Baker, University of Texas, 1957 – Secretary of State – Bush administration; founder of the James Baker Institute
 Barber Conable, Cornell, 1943 – president of the World Bank; Congressman from New York, 1965–85
 Benjamin Harrison, Miami University (Ohio), 1852 – 23rd President of the United States
 John W. Foster, Indiana University, 1855 – 32nd Secretary of State
 David F. Houston, University of South Carolina, 1887 – 5th Secretary of Agriculture, 48th Secretary of the Treasury
 Harold Ickes, University of Chicago, 1897 – Secretary of the Interior, 1933–46
 Hamilton Jordan,  University of Georgia, 1964 – White House Chief of Staff, Carter administration
 Robert P. Patterson, Union College, 1912- former Secretary of War
 Wilton Persons, Auburn University, 1916 – White House Chief of Staff, Eisenhower administration
 Geoffrey R. Pyatt, University of California, Irvine, 1985 – United States Ambassador to Greece
 Tom Schieffer, University of Texas, 1970 – United States Ambassador to Japan
 Adlai E. Stevenson, Centre College, 1860 – 23rd Vice President of the United States
 Frederick Moore Vinson, Centre College, 1909 – US Secretary of the Treasury

Judicial branch
 William Gordon Mathews, University of Virginia School of Law, 1897 – Federal judge
 James C. McReynolds, Vanderbilt University, 1883 – Associate Justice of the Supreme Court of the United States
 Sherman Minton, Indiana University, 1915 – Associate Justice of the Supreme Court of the United States
 Milford K. Smith, associate justice of the Vermont Supreme Court
 Frederick Moore Vinson, Centre College, 1909 – Chief Justice of the United States

Governors
 Neil Abercrombie, Union, 1959 – Governor of Hawaii, 2010-14
 Forrest H. Anderson, University of Montana, 1937 – Governor of Montana, 1969–73
 Jerry Apodaca, University of New Mexico, 1956 – Governor of New Mexico, 1974–79
 Joseph C. Blackburn, Centre College, 1857 – Governor of the Panama Canal Zone, 1907–09; also a US Senator from Illinois
 Roger D. Branigin, Franklin College, 1923 – Governor of Indiana, 1965–69
 John Y. Brown, Jr., University of Kentucky, 1956 – Governor of Kentucky, 1979–83
 George Busbee, University of Georgia, 1950 – Governor of Georgia, 1975–83
 William Prentice Cooper, Vanderbilt University, 1917 – Governor of Tennessee, 1939–45
 Jon Corzine, University of Illinois, 1969 – Governor of New Jersey 2006–2010
 William Haselden Ellerbe, Wofford College, 1883 – Governor of South Carolina, 1877–99
 Samuel H. Elrod, DePauw University, 1882 – Governor of South Dakota, 1905–07
 Joseph B. Ely, Williams College, 1902 – Governor of Massachusetts, 1931–35
 Norman A. Erbe, University of Iowa, 1947 – Governor of Iowa, 1960–63
 Booth Gardner, University of Washington, 1958 – Governor of Washington, 1985–93
 Chester Harding, University of Alabama, 1884 – Governor of the Panama Canal Zone, 1917–21
 Thomas W. Hardwick, Mercer University, 1892 – Governor of Georgia, 1921–23; also a US Senator and Congressman
 Warren E. Hearnes, University of Missouri, 1943 – Governor of Missouri, 1965–73
 James Holshouser, Davidson College, 1956 – Governor of North Carolina, 1973–77
 Herman G. Kump, University of Virginia, 1905 – Governor of West Virginia, 1932–36
 Hill McAlister, Vanderbilt University, 1897 – Governor of Tennessee, 1933–37
 Tom McCall, University of Oregon, 1936 – Governor of Oregon, 1966–75
 Douglas McKay, Oregon State University, 1941 – Governor of Oregon, 1949–52
 Arthur C. Mellette, Indiana University, 1864 – Governor of South Dakota, 1889–93
 John T. Morrison, Lafayette College, 1880 – Governor of Idaho, 1903–05
 Ragnvald A. Nestos, University of North Dakota, 1904 – Governor of North Dakota, 1921–25
 Malcolm R. Patterson, Vanderbilt University, 1882 – Governor of Tennessee, 1907–11
 Alexander Ramsey, Lafayette College, 1836 (Honorary) – Governor of Minnesota, 1849–53 also US Senator, Congressman, and Secretary of War
 Jim Risch, University of Idaho, 1965 – Governor of Idaho, 2005–06
 Hulett C. Smith, University of Pennsylvania, 1938 – Governor of West Virginia, 1965–69
 Adlai Stevenson II, Princeton University, 1922 – Governor of Illinois, 1949–53
 Ernest Vandiver, University of Georgia, 1940 – Governor of Georgia, 1959–63
 William Winter, University of Mississippi, 1944 – Governor of Mississippi, 1980–84
 Mark White, Baylor University, 1962 – Governor of Texas, 1983–87
 C. C. Young, UC Berkeley, 1892 – Governor of California, 1927–31

US Congressmen

 Neil Abercrombie, Union, 1959 – representative from Hawaii 1986–1987, 1991–2010
 John Alexander Anderson, Miami University (Ohio), 1853 – representative from Kansas, 1879–1886
 William B. Bankhead, University of Alabama, 1893 – former Speaker of the House, representative from Alabama, 1917–1940
 Douglas Barnard, Mercer University, 1943 – representative from Georgia, 1977–1992
 Chris Bell, University of Texas, 1988 – representative from Texas, 2002–2004
 Richard Walker Bolling, University of South, 1937 – representative from Missouri, 1949–1982
 Charles G. Bond, Ohio State University, 1899 – representative from New York, 1921–1922
 Edward J. Bonin, Dickinson College, 1933 –  representative from Pennsylvania, 1953–1954
 William G. Brantley, University of Georgia, 1881 – representative from Georgia, 1897–1912
 Jim Broyhill, University of North Carolina, 1950 – representative from North Carolina, 1963–1984
 Bradley Byrne, Duke University, 1977 – representative from Alabama, 2013–present
 Howard Callaway, Georgia Tech, 1948 – representative from Georgia, 1965–1966
 Frank Ertel Carlyle, University of North Carolina, 1920 – representative from North Carolina, 1949–1956
 James M. Collins, Southern Methodist University, 1937 – representative from Texas, 1967–1982
 Robert J. Corbett, Allegheny College, 1927 – representative from Pennsylvania, 1939–1972
 Jim Courter, Colgate University, 1963 – representative from New Jersey, 1979–1990
 Edwin R. Durno, University of Oregon, 1921 – representative from Oregon, 1961–1962
 John Fleming, Jr., Ole Miss, 1973 – representative from Louisiana, 2009–present
 Charles K. Fletcher, Stanford University, 1924 – representative from California, 1947–1948
 Wyche Fowler, Davidson College, 1962 – representative from Georgia, 1977–1986
 Burton L. French, University of Idaho, 1901 – representative from Idaho, 1903–1932
 James G. Fulton, Penn State, 1924 – representative from Pennsylvania, 1945–1972
 Charles Goodell, Williams College, 1949 – representative from New York, 1959–1970
 Oscar Lee Gray, University of Alabama, 1885 – representative from Alabama, 1915–1917
 Francis M. Griffith, Franklin College, 1874 – representative from Indiana, 1897–1904
 James M. Griggs, Vanderbilt University, 1881 – representative from Georgia, 1897–1910
 Andrew H. Hamilton, Wabash College, 1855 – representative from Indiana, 1875–1878
 Thomas Hardwick, Mercer University, 1892 – representative from Georgia, 1903–1918
 Rufus Hardy, University of Georgia, 1875 – representative from Texas, 1907–1922
 Joel Hefley, Oklahoma State, 1959 – representative from Colorado, 1987–2007
 William M. Howard, University of Georgia, 1877 – representative from Georgia, 1897–1910
 Jared Huffman, UC Santa Barbara, 1986 – representative from California, 2013–present
 John Jarman, Westminster College, 1936  – representative from Oklahoma, 1951–1976
 Royal C. Johnson, University of South Dakota, 1906 – representative from South Dakota, 1915–1932
 John L. Kennedy, Knox College, 1883 – representative from Nebraska, 1905–1906
 Frank Kratovil, McDaniel College, 1990 – representative from Maryland, 2009–2011
 Charles M. La Follette, Wabash College, 1920 – representative from Indiana, 1943–1946
 James G. Lee, Emory University, 1880 – representative from Georgia, 1905–1926
 William Lemke, University of North Dakota, 1903 – representative from North Dakota, 1933–1950
 Pete McCloskey, Stanford University, 1951 – author of the Endangered Species Act; representative from California, 1967–1983
 Robert C. McEwen, University of Vermont, 1942 – representative from New York, 1965–1980
 Charles F. McLaughlin, University of Nebraska, 1908 – representative from Nebraska, 1935–1942
 James McNulty, Arizona, 1950 – representative from Arizona, 1983–1985
 Luke Messer, Wabash College, 1991 – representative from Indiana, 2013–present
 Walt Minnick, Whitman College, 1958 – representative from Idaho, 2009–2011
 Chester Mize, University of Kansas, 1939 – representative from Kansas, 1965–1970
 Martin A. Morrison, Butler University, 1883 – representative from Indiana 1910–1916
 Charles L. Moses, Mercer University, 1876 – representative from Georgia, 1891–1896
 Frederick A. Muhlenberg, Gettysburg College, 1908 – representative from Pennsylvania, 1947–1948
 William B. Oliver, University of Alabama, 1887– representative from Alabama, 1915–1936
 James W. Overstreet, Mercer University, 1888 – representative from Georgia, 1905–1922
 Jim Ramstad, University of Minnesota – representative from Minnesota, 1991–2009
 Dwight L. Rogers, Mercer University, 1910  – representative from Florida, 1945–1954
 Paul G. Rogers, University of Florida, 1942 – representative from Florida, 1955–1978
 David Rouzer, North Carolina State, 1994 – representative from North Carolina, 2015–present
 Max Sandlin, Baylor, 1975 – representative from Texas, 1997–2004
 Jouette Shouse, University of Missouri, 1899 – representative from Illinois, 1915–1918
 Garner E. Shriver, Wichita State University, 1934 – representative from Kansas, 1961–1976
 Jim Slattery, Washburn University, 1970 – representative from Kansas, 1983–1995
 Albert T. Smith Jr., Auburn University, 1953 – representative from Alabama, 1981–1983
 Adlai E. Stevenson, Centre College, 1860 – representative from Illinois, 1875–1880
 Willis Sweet, University of Nebraska, 1879 – representative from Idaho, 1889–1894
 Clark W. Thompson, University of Oregon, 1918 – representative from Texas, 1933–1966
 Edwin Keith Thomson, University of Wyoming, 1939 – representative from Wyoming, 1955–1960
 Samuel Tribble, University of Georgia, 1891 – representative from Georgia, 1911–1916
 Frederick M. Vinson, Centre College, 1909 – representative from Kentucky, 1924–1928, 1930–1937
 Francis E. Walter, Lafayette College, 1916 – representative from Pennsylvania, 1933–1964
 Thomas B. Ward, Miami University (Ohio), 1855 – representative from Indiana, 1883–1886

US Senators
 Brock Adams, University of Washington, 1948 – Secretary of Treasury; Congressman from Washington; senator from Washington, 1987–1993
 John Allen, Wabash College, 1867 – senator from Washington, 1889–1892
 Joseph C. Blackburn, Centre College, 1857 – senator from Kentucky, 1885–1906
 Mike Braun, Wabash College, 1976 – senator from Indiana, 2019-present
 James Broyhill, University of North Carolina, 1950 – senator from North Carolina, 1985–1991
 Harry P. Cain, University of the South, 1929 – senator from Washington, 1946–1952
 Thomas Connally, University of Texas, 1898 – senator from Texas, 1929–1952
 Harry Darby, University of Illinois, 1917 – senator from Kansas, 1949–1950
 Dennis DeConcini, University of Arizona, 1959 – senator from Arizona, 1977–1994
 Duncan U. Fletcher, Vanderbilt University, 1880 – senator from Florida, 1909–36
 Wyche Fowler, Davidson College, 1962 – senator from Georgia, 1987–1992
 James Z. George, University of Mississippi – senator from Mississippi, 1881–1898
 Thomas Hardwick, Mercer University, 1892 – senator from Georgia, 1913–1918
 J. Bennett Johnston, Washington & Lee College, 1954 – senator from Louisiana, 1972–1997
 Eugene D. Millikin, University of Colorado, 1913 – senator from Colorado, 1941–1956
 Sherman Minton, Indiana University Senator from Indiana, 1935–1941
 Sam Nunn, Georgia Tech 1960 – founder of the Nuclear Threat Initiative; senator from Georgia, 1972–1997
 James E. Risch, University of Idaho, 1965, 1968 – J.D.; senator from Idaho, 2008–present
 Arthur Raymond Robinson, University of Chicago, 1913 – senator from Indiana, 1925–1934
 Elbert Thomas, University of Utah, 1906 – senator from Utah, 1933–1950
 John Elmer Thomas, DePauw University, 1900 – senator from Oklahoma, 1927–1950
 Thomas R. Underwood, University of Kentucky, 1919 – Congressman from Indiana; senator from Indiana, 1951–1952
 William F. Vilas, University of Wisconsin, 1858 – senator from Wisconsin, 1891–1896
 Edward Cary Walthall, University of Mississippi – senator from Indiana, 1885–1894
 Xenophon P. Wilfley, Washington University in St. Louis, 1899 – senator from Missouri, 1917–1918
 Raymond E. Willis, Wabash College, 1896 – senator from Indiana, 1941–1956

Other
 Jean Baptiste Adoue, University of Texas, 1906 – former mayor of Dallas, Texas
 Ralph Haben, University of Florida – former Speaker of the Florida House of Representatives
 Adam Hasner, University of Maryland, 1991 – House Majority Leader, Florida House of Representatives, 2002–present
 John F. Hayes, Washburn University – majority leader, Kansas House of Representatives
 Jim Herring, University of Mississippi 1960 – state chairman of the Mississippi Republican Party 2001–2008; state circuit court judge, 1997–1999
 Thomas M. Honan, Indiana University Bloomington, 1899 – Speaker of the Indiana House of Representatives, 1908-1910; Indiana Attorney General, 1911-1915
 Brad Little, University of Idaho 1977 – Lieutenant Governor of Idaho, 2009–
 Henry F. Mason, Wisconsin, 1881 – Chief Justice of the Kansas Supreme Court
 William Harding Mayes, Vanderbilt University, 1881 – Lieutenant Governor of Texas, 1912–14
 Charles D. McAtee, Washburn University, 1950 – Marine Corps officer; FBI agent; candidate for Congress; Kansas Attorney General; supervised the last executions in Kansas as director of penal institutions, 1965–1969
 Warren W. Shaw, Washburn University, 1931 – judge; member of Eisenhower's staff during World War II; representative in the Kansas House of Representatives; 1954 Republican nominee for Kansas governor
 Shap Smith, University of Vermont, 1987 – current Speaker of the Vermont House of Representatives
 Robert Stone, Washburn University, 1889 – Speaker of the Kansas House of Representatives, 1915
 Richard Vinroot, University of North Carolina, 1963 – Mayor of Charlotte, North Carolina, 1991–95
 Kevin White, Williams College, 1952 – second longest-serving mayor in Boston history
 Drew Wrigley, University of North Dakota 1988 – Lieutenant Governor of North Dakota
 Joshua Soule Zimmerman, Randolph–Macon College, 1892 – West Virginia House Delegate; Hampshire County, West Virginia prosecuting attorney; orchardist

Literature
 Ray Stannard Baker, Michigan State University, 1889 – biographer, Pulitzer Prize winner
 Louis Bromfield, Columbia University, 1920 – Pulitzer Prize winner for Early Autumn
 Po Bronson, Stanford, 1986 – writer
 Eugene Field, Knox College, 1872 – poet, author of children's books
 Walter Havighurst, Ohio Wesleyan University, 1923 – writer and professor
 Don Herold, Indiana University, 1912 – humorist
 James Michener, Swarthmore College, 1929 – Pulitzer Prize winner, Presidential Medal of Freedom recipient
 Dan Moldea, The University of Akron, 1973 – author, writer of organized crime and American politics books
 Reynolds Price, Duke University, 1955 – writer, essayist
 Edward K. Thompson, University of North Dakota, 1927 – managing editor of Life magazine
 William Allen White, University of Kansas, 1890 – editor, writer, Pulitzer Prize winner

Media

 Earle C. Anthony, UC Berkeley, 1903 – pioneer broadcaster; founder of KFI
 Gary Bender, Wichita State, 1962 – sports anchor
 Elmer Davis, Franklin College, 1910 – director of the War Information Department in WWII; Peabody Award recipient
Willie Geist, Vanderbilt University, 1997 – NBC News personality, co-host of Morning Joe and Sunday Today with Willie Geist anchor
 Harry Kalas, University of Iowa, 1959 – sportscaster
 Robert Kintner, University of Washington, 1944 – president of the ABC, 1950–56
 William Harding Mayes, Vanderbilt University, 1881 – president of the Texas Press Association, 1889–90; president of the National Editorial Association, 1908; president of the Association of American Schools and Departments of Journalism, 1920–21
 Byron Price, Wabash College, 1912 – director of Censorship in WWII; Pulitzer Prize recipient
 Bob Prince, University of Pittsburgh, 1938 – sportscaster
 Bob Schieffer, Texas Christian University, 1959 – CBS News anchor
 Frank Stanton, Ohio Wesleyan University, 1937 – former president of CBS
 Trey Wingo, Baylor, 1985 – ESPN anchor

Military

Medal of Honor and Victoria Cross recipients
 John Henry Balch, Northwestern University, 1920 – Medal of Honor recipient, World War I
 John C. Black, Wabash, 1862 – Medal of Honor recipient, Civil War
 William P. Black, Wabash, 1864 – Medal of Honor recipient, Civil War
 Henry V. Boynton, Kentucky Military Institute, 1858 – Medal of Honor recipient, Civil War
 Robert W. Cary, University of Missouri, 1912 – Medal of Honor recipient, peacetime; Distinguished Service Cross, World War I
 Frederick Funston, University of Kansas, 1890 – Medal of Honor recipient, Philippine–American War
 Robert Hampton Gray, University of British Columbia, 1940 – Victoria Cross recipient, World War II
 Alexander R. Skinker, Washington University in St. Louis, 1905 – Medal of Honor recipient, World War I
 Leon Vance, University of Oklahoma, 1937 – Medal of Honor recipient, World War II

Prominent military personnel
 Jacob Ammen, Indiana University, 1830 – general, Union Army, Civil War
 David Enoch Beam, Indiana University, 1860 - captain, Union Army, Civil War
 William Montague Browne, University of Georgia, 1843 – general, secretary of state, Confederate States of America
 Arthur S. Champeny, Washburn University – brigadier general; only person in US history to receive the Distinguished Service Cross in three separate wars
 John K. Davis, University of New Mexico, 1951 – assistant commandant, Marine Corps 1983–86
 Louis R. de Steiguer, Ohio University, 1887 – admiral; commander in chief, Battle Fleet, US Fleet, 1927–1928
 Julian J. Ewell, Duke University, 1936 – United States Army lieutenant general; Commander of Operation Speedy Express; commander of the 9th US Infantry Division
 Robert L. Ghormley, University of Idaho, 1903 – commander of all forces during the Guadalcanal campaign in WWII
 Arthur F. Gorham, Miami University, circa 1932 (uninitiated, transferred to West Point)  – lieutenant colonel; commander, 1st Battalion, 505th Parachute Infantry Regiment during Operation Husky, the invasion of Sicily; twice awarded the Distinguished Service Cross
 Leonard D. Heaton, Denison College, 1923 – US major general Surgeon General
 Charles Horner, University of Iowa, 1958 – commander of NORAD North American Aerospace Defense Command; Commander of Allied Air Force for Desert Storm
 Edgar Jadwin, Lafayette College, 1888 – lieutenant general, chief of engineers 1926–1929
 David E. Jeremiah, University of Oregon, 1955 – admiral, acting chairman Joint Chief of Staffs, October 1993
 Edward P. King, University of Georgia, 1903 – major general, commanding officer, Bataan, World War II
 Eli Long, Indiana University, 1855 – major general, Union Army, Civil War
 John S. McCain, Sr., University of Mississippi, 1905 – vice admiral and commander of all land-based naval aircraft in the South Pacific, World War II
 Scott O'Grady, University of Washington, 1988 – USAF captain shot down over Bosnia, rescued six days later
 Edwin D. Patrick, Indiana University, 1916 – major general, commander of the 6th Infantry Division in WWII
 Bernard W. Rogers, Kansas State University, 1943 – general, Supreme Allied Commander Europe, NATO
 Leroy W. Stutz, Washburn University, 1960 – Air Force colonel; spent 2,284 days as a prisoner of war during Vietnam
 Robert Taplett, University of South Dakota, 1940 – Navy Cross recipient, Korean War

Nobel Prize winners
 Adam G. Riess, Massachusetts Institute of Technology, 1992 – Physics, 2011

Religion
 Charles Minnigerode Beckwith, Bishop of Alabama
 Kirkman George Finlay, University of the South, 1900 – first Bishop of the Episcopal Diocese of Upper South Carolina
 Clare Purcell, Emory, 1910 – Bishop of the Methodist Episcopal Church, South
 Ralph W. Sockman, Ohio Wesleyan, 1911 – evangelist, writer
 David Swing, Miami University, 1852 – founder of the Central Church of Chicago

Science and technology
 Powel Crosley Jr., University of Cincinnati, 1909 – inventor; owner of Cincinnati Reds
 Thomas Francis, Jr., Allegheny College, 1921 – physician, virologist, and epidemiologist; Presidential Medal of Freedom recipient
 Drew Houston, MIT, 2006 – founder and CEO of Dropbox
 Mark Hurd, Baylor University, 1979 – former CEO of NCR Corporation, Hewlett-Packard, and Oracle Corporation
 Charles Peter McColough, Dalhousie University, 1943 – former chairman and CEO of Xerox
 Patrick Piemonte, Purdue University, 2004 – inventor and user interface designer
 Homer Clyde Snook, Ohio Wesleyan University, 1900 – inventor; electrical engineer

Sports
 Mike Racy, Washburn University, NCAA VP, MIAA Commissioner
 Mike Adamle, Northwestern University, 1971 – NFL safety, broadcaster
 Bill Austin, Oregon State College, 1949 – NFL lineman and head coach
 Terry Baker, Oregon State University, 1963 – NFL & CFL quarterback, Heisman Trophy winner, first selection of 1963 NFL draft, NCAA Final Four (basketball)
 Ernest Bearg, Washburn University, 1916 – head football coach, Washburn and University of Nebraska
 Jim Bowden, Rollins College, 1983 – MLB general manager, Cincinnati Reds and Washington Nationals
 Richard R. Baggins, Case Western Reserve, 1901 – MLB pitcher, Cleveland Blues
 Rich Brooks, Oregon State University, 1963 – head football coach, University of Oregon, and St. Louis Rams (NFL), and University of Kentucky
 Dave Burba, Ohio State University, 1988 – MLB pitcher
 Ron Cey, Washington State University, 1970 – MLB third baseman, Los Angeles Dodgers and Chicago Cubs
 Gunther Cunningham, University of Oregon, 1968 – NFL defensive coordinator, Kansas City Chiefs, former head coach
 Alvin Dark, Louisiana State University, 1945 – MLB infielder, manager; Rookie of the Year, 1948
 Dwight F. Davis, Washington University in St. Louis, 1899 – tennis player, namesake of the Davis Cup
 Eugene Davis, University of Virginia, 1899 – football coach; later a surgeon
 Morgan Ensberg, University of Southern California, 1998 – MLB infielder
 Weeb Ewbank, Miami University (Ohio), 1928 – NFL and AFL head coach; Pro Football Hall of Fame
 Scott Fortune, Stanford, 1988 – Olympic gold medalist, volleyball
 Ralph Friedgen, University of Maryland, 1970 – head coach, University of Maryland football
 Gary Gait, Syracuse University, 1990 – lacrosse, multiple All-American and NCAA champion
 Paul Gait, Syracuse University, 1990 – lacrosse, multiple All-American and NCAA champion
 Laddie Gale, University of Oregon, 1939 – Basketball Hall of Fame
 Lou Gehrig, Columbia University, 1925 – MLB first baseman, New York Yankees; Baseball Hall of Fame
 Jack Gelineau, McGill University, 1949 – NHL goaltender, Calder Memorial Trophy winner
 Matt Grevers, Northwestern University, 2007 – Olympic gold medalist, swimming
 Jack Ham, Penn State University, 1971 – NFL All-Pro linebacker, Pittsburgh Steelers, Pro Football Hall of Fame
 Jack Harbaugh, Bowling Green University, 1961 – college football coach
 Tom Harmon, University of Michigan, 1941 – Heisman Trophy winner, broadcaster
 Tommy Moore, Stephen F. Austin University, 1966 - NFL official sidejudge, replay official
 Taner Hamzawi, Florida State University, 2006 - Arkansas head coach
 Terry Hoeppner, Franklin College, 1969 – college football coach
 Hughie Jennings, Cornell University, 1904 – MLB infielder, manager, Detroit Tigers, Baseball Hall of Fame
 Wilbur Johns, UCLA, 1925 – UCLA basketball coach and athletic director
 William Johnson, University of Kansas, 1933 – center, Basketball Hall of Fame
 Bob Locker, Iowa State, 1960 - MLB pitcher, played on 1972 World Series champion Oakland Athletics
 Don Meredith, Southern Methodist University, 1960 – NFL All-Pro quarterback, Dallas Cowboys
 Dick Nolan, University of Maryland, 1955 – former head coach, San Francisco 49ers
 J. T. O'Sullivan, U.C. Davis, 2002 – NFL quarterback, San Francisco 49ers
 Jim Otto, University of Miami, 1960 – NFL center, Oakland Raiders, Pro Football Hall of Fame
 Dave Parks, Texas Tech University, 1964 – NFL wide receiver, first selection of 1964 NFL Draft, San Francisco 49ers
 William Porter Payne, University of Georgia, 1969 – president of Atlanta Olympic Committee, chairman of Augusta National Golf Club
 Grantland Rice,  Vanderbilt University, 1901 – sportswriter
 Detlef Schrempf,  University of Washington, 1986 – NBA All-Star forward
 Ted Schroeder, Stanford University, 1942 – tennis player, Wimbledon and US Open champion
 Jason Simontacchi, San Jose State University, 1996 – MLB pitcher, St. Louis Cardinals and Washington Nationals
 Russell Stewart, Washington & Lee University, 2012 – Gaglardi Award nominee, captain of record setting Phi Delta Theta Intramural Basketball team, only Division 3 player to score on offense, defense, special teams, and off the field
 Steve Tasker, Northwestern University, 1985 – NFL All-pro special teams player, wide receiver, Buffalo Bills
 Zach Thomas, Texas Tech University, 1996 – NFL linebacker, Miami Dolphins
 Mike Timlin, Southwestern University, 1988 – MLB pitcher, four World Series championship teams
 Bill Toomey, University of Colorado, 1961 – Olympic gold medalist, 1968 decathlon
 Doak Walker, Southern Methodist University, 1950 – NFL All-Pro halfback, Detroit Lions, 1948 Heisman Trophy winner, Pro Football Hall of Fame
 Wayne Walker, University of Idaho, 1958 – NFL All-Pro linebacker, Detroit Lions (started all 15 seasons)
 Wes Welker, Texas Tech University, 2004 – NFL All-Pro wide receiver, New England Patriots, Denver Broncos
 Gary Williams, University of Maryland, 1968 – head basketball coach, University of Maryland

References

External links
 Collett, Ritter (1998). In the Bond: Phi Delta Theta at 150. Landfall Press
 Havighurst, Walter E. (1975). From Six at First: A History of Phi Delta Theta 1848–1973. George Banta Company, Inc.

Lists of members of United States student societies
members